Peter Augustus Rull Sr. (17 November 1922 – 5 January 2014) was a sport shooter who represented Hong Kong at five editions of the Summer Olympic Games. He competed in the 50 metre rifle prone event each time, finishing 36th in 1960, 70th in 1964, 71st in 1968, 83rd in 1972, and joint-41st (with five other participants) in 1976. He also took part in the 50 metre rifle three positions tournament in 1964, where he placed 49th. He was born in Estonia. He also took part in six editions of the Commonwealth Games, the last of which was in 1994, after which he retired from international competition. By career he was a shooting coach for the police and a land bailiff. His son, Peter Rull Jr., competed for Hong Kong as a sport shooter at the 1984 Summer Olympics.

References

1922 births
2014 deaths
Estonian emigrants to Hong Kong
Hong Kong male sport shooters
Olympic shooters of Hong Kong
Shooters at the 1960 Summer Olympics
Shooters at the 1964 Summer Olympics
Shooters at the 1968 Summer Olympics
Shooters at the 1972 Summer Olympics
Shooters at the 1976 Summer Olympics
Commonwealth Games competitors for Hong Kong
Shooters at the 1978 Commonwealth Games
Shooters at the 1982 Commonwealth Games
Shooters at the 1986 Commonwealth Games
Shooters at the 1990 Commonwealth Games
Shooters at the 1994 Commonwealth Games
Shooters at the 1958 Asian Games
Shooters at the 1962 Asian Games
Shooters at the 1966 Asian Games
Shooters at the 1970 Asian Games
Shooters at the 1974 Asian Games
Shooters at the 1978 Asian Games
Asian Games competitors for Hong Kong